Ebu is a town of Haifeng County in eastern Guangdong province, China, located  from the South China Sea coast and  southwest of the county seat and served by China National Highway 324. , it has one residential community and nine villages under its administration.

References 

Towns in Guangdong
Haifeng County